¡Qué hacer! is a 1972 Chilean-American drama film directed by Raúl Ruiz, Nina Serrano, and Saul Landau. According to co-director Nina Serrano, "The formal script in the first draft was written by Saul Landau, Raul Ruiz, and Jim Becket. But as the film was somewhat improvised the actors and I also added or molded the script as the filming went along." It was screened in the Directors' Fortnight section of the 1972 Cannes Film Festival.

Cast
 Sandra Archer as Suzanne McCloud
 Aníbal Reyna as Simon Vallejo
 Richard Stahl as Martin Scott Bradford
 Luis Alarcón as Osvaldo Alarcón
 Pablo de la Barra as Hugo Alarcón
 Sergio Zorrilla as himself
 Salvador Allende as himself
 Country Joe McDonald as Country (as Joe McDonald)
 Jorge Yáñez as Padre Eduardo
 Sergio Bravo as Kidnapper
 Óscar Castro as Kidnapper
 Poli Délano as Old comrade
 Mónica Echeverría as Irene Alarcón
 Elizabeth Farnsworth as Margaret
 Saul Landau as Seymour Rosenberg
 Rodrigo Maturana as Old comrade
 Pablo Neruda as himself

References

External links
 

1972 films
1972 drama films
Chilean drama films
1970s Spanish-language films
Films directed by Raúl Ruiz